The 2022 New Mexico State Treasurer election took place on November 8, 2022, to elect the next New Mexico State Treasurer. Incumbent Democratic Party Treasurer Tim Eichenberg was term-limited and could not seek re-election.

Democratic primary

Candidates

Nominee
Laura Montoya, former Sandoval County treasurer

Eliminated in primary
Heather Benavidez, former magistrate judge

Endorsements

Results

Republican primary

Candidates

Nominee
Harry Montoya, Santa Fe county commissioner

Results

General election

Polling

Results

Notes

References

External links
Official campaign websites
Harry Montoya (R) for State Treasurer
Laura Montoya (D) for State Treasurer

State Treasurer
New Mexico